Raymond Cromley (August 23, 1910 – February 23, 2007) was a Colonel in the United States Army and a Journalist.  Prior to the Second World War, Cromley was a correspondent and journalist in Japan.  Following its outbreak, Cromley joined the American army and served in the China Burma India Theater.  He was a member of the United States Army Observation Group to Yenan, better known as the Dixie Mission.  After the war, he went on to become a writer for The Wall Street Journal. He is buried in Arlington National Cemetery.

See also
Dixie Mission

References
Carolle J. Carter, Mission to Yenan: American Liaison with the Chinese Communists 1944-1947 (Lexington: University of Kentucky Press, 1997).
Raymond Cromley, "My Japanese Wife, The Girl I Loved and Left in Tokyo" (The American Magazine, December 1942 Issue)
Sullivan, Patricia, "Raymond Cromley, columnist covered the Pentagon" Obituatry (Boston Globe, Feb 28, 2007) (Retrieved from www.Boston.com June 28, 2012)

External links
2002 Audio Interview with Cromley with Transcript

2007 deaths
United States Army officers
Dixie Mission participants
American male journalists
1910 births
Burials at Arlington National Cemetery
20th-century American journalists
United States Army personnel of World War II
American expatriates in Japan
American expatriates in China